Gran Hermano 17 is the seventeenth season of Gran Hermano, the Spanish version of the reality television series franchise Big Brother. The 17th season started airing on September 8, 2016 on Telecinco. On Wednesday June 29, Mediaset announced an official statement that Mercedes Mila left the show after 16 years, and was replaced by Jorge Javier Vázquez.

This season was won by 20-year-old Beatriz Retamal on Day 106. Alain has also competed in the eleventh season of Secret Story in France where he finished also 5th.

Housemates

Nomination table

Notes

: On Day 1, Laura and Meritxell and Cris and Fernando were automatically nominated as they were the only housemates who entered with a friend, and it takes place as the final phase of the casting. 
: Pol won the right to enter to the Club and to cancel the nominations of a housemate. He chose Candelas.
: Pablo was fake evicted and sent to the ContraClub but he decided to leave the house.
: The members of the club, Bárbara, Fernando and Pol, won the right to give the power of nomination with 6, 4 and 2 points. They chose to give it to Rodrigo.
: The members of the club, Beatriz, Fernando and Pol, won the right to name an extra nominee. They chose to nominate Beatriz.
: Rebeca won the public vote and became an official housemate. For this reason she was exempt from nominations.
: The members of the club, Miguel, Pol and Rodrigo, won the right to give 6 points to nominate to a housemate. They chose to give them to Noelia.
: Beatriz was evicted but she had 5 boxes: the ones from Rodrigo, Clara, Miguel, Montse and herself. She found the extra life inside Montse's box and she could return to the house.
: Adara, Bárbara and Beatriz won a public vote and moved the club.
: The members of the club, Adara, Bárbara and Beatriz, won the right to cancel the nominations of a housemate. They chose Fernando.
: This round of nominations were to save.
: The members of the club, Adara, Beatriz and Miguel, won the right to give one extra positive point. They voted for Noelia to get it.
: The members of the club, Beatriz, Clara and Miguel, won the right to name an extra nominee. They chose to nominate Pol.
: Bárbara refused to use her right to nominate this week.
: All housemates were automatically nominated due to their bad behaviour during that week.
: Simona was exempt from nominations as she was a new housemate.
: The members of the club, Alain, Clara and Miguel, won the right to save a nominee and replace him/her with one of the members of the club. Alain decided to save Meritxell and replace her with himself.
: The members of the club, Beatriz, Miguel and Rodrigo, won the right to save a nominee but they decided to not use it.
: The relatives' housemates made the nominations instead, themselves.
: The members of the club, Adara, Beatriz and Miguel, won the right to give 3 extra points to a nominee and they gave them to Meritxell.
: Lines were opened to vote for the winner. The housemate with fewest votes would be evicted.

Total nominations received

Debate: Blind results

Repechage 
The first 3 evicted contestants would live in the apartment with 3 others first evicted from previous editions; they were Maite Galdeano (GH 16), Amor Romeira (GH 9) and María José Galera (GH 1). They had the mission of being advised how to improve their way through the competition. The voting public would decide the top ex-housemates to officially return to the Gran Hermano house as official housemates.

After Pablo walked from the ContraClub, this twist was cancelled and the three former housemates had to leave the house. The following evictions would happen as normal.

Finally, the public voting would decide the top ex-housemates to officially return to the Gran Hermano house as official housemates.
The repechage was officially announced on Day 50 (October 27, 2016). All the evicted housemates (Pablo, Candelas, Montse and Fernando) were there. They are currently living in the Apartment (Secret Room or House 2).

 Not officially. Shown moments before closing the voting.

Twists

Extra life box
On Day 1, when all the housemates entered, Jorge Javier told them each to take one of the 17 boxes that were introduced to them. One of these boxes contained an extra life which allowed an evicted housemate to return to the house immediately. Once an evicted housemate arrived at the studio, the box would be opened and he/she would find out if the extra life is inside. Each housemate had the option to keep their box or give it to another housemate.

Club GH

Ratings

"Galas"

"Debates"

"Límite 48 Horas"

External links
 Official site on Telecinco.es
 Gran Hermano main site
 "Gran Hermano 24 Hours Live and Free" 

2016 Spanish television seasons
GH 17